Bradley Kenneth Roberts (born January 10, 1964) is the lead singer and guitarist for the Canadian folk-rock band Crash Test Dummies. He sings in the bass-baritone range. The band is best known internationally for their 1993 album God Shuffled His Feet and single "Mmm Mmm Mmm Mmm" and best known in Canada for the 1991 single "Superman's Song".

Career

Early beginnings
His musical career began with a bachelor's degree with honours from University of Winnipeg in 1986.

Roberts began performing with his brother Dan in a house band for the Blue Note Cafe in Winnipeg under the moniker Bad Brad Roberts and the St. James Rhythm Pigs. The band gradually evolved into The Crash Test Dummies. While studying at university and working as a bartender at The Spectrum Cabaret, Roberts began writing his own songs and introducing them to the band. After attending a songwriters' workshop with Lyle Lovett at the Winnipeg Folk Festival, he wrote "Superman's Song".

Record deal and debut album
Demos of Roberts's songs found themselves in the hands of various music company execs across Canada, and the quirky bar band that had just begun to write original material found itself with record deal options which led The Crash Test Dummies into a rushed, but nevertheless well-received debut album, The Ghosts That Haunt Me. The album introduced the band to the rest of the Canadian provinces, selling over 400,000 copies in Canada alone and also garnering a 1991 Juno Award for Group of the Year.

Second album and international success
With more time and finances, Roberts set about writing the band's second album, God Shuffled His Feet. This to date is the band's best selling and most popular album, taking them into the international arena of musical exposure. The album has sold over six million copies and caused The Crash Test Dummies to be nominated for three Grammy Awards in 1994. The group was nominated for eleven other Junos from 1992 to 2000.

Third album: A Worm's Life
A Worm's Life was released in 1996, selling over one million copies and showcasing a harder-edged sound as the band continued to evolve, producing this album on their own.

Fourth album: Give Yourself a Hand
1999 introduced a mix of electronic funk and spontaneous wordplay with Give Yourself a Hand. Roberts met Greg Wells at a songwriters' workshop and invited him to co-write and assist in recording this album inspired by influences and flavours of Roberts' new home in Harlem, New York.

Car accident and independent release
On September 28, 2000, Roberts was severely injured when he crashed his car on a dirt road in Yarmouth County, Nova Scotia. Marijuana was discovered in his pocket while he was loaded into an ambulance and he was then charged for possession by the RCMP. While he was recuperating from the accident, he began jamming with locals (The Great Wind Jammers from Argyle, Yarmouth County) and produced from these sessions I Don't Care That You Don't Mind. This was the first album released by the band independent of a major record label.

Sixth album: Puss 'n' Boots
Puss 'n' Boots was released in October 2003 with a European and additional American version.

Further releases
A  Crash Test Dummies album, Oooh La La!, was released in 2010.  This was followed with the solo release on an album of Mantras, entitled Rajanaka: Mantra, in 2011.

Musical influences
His influences as a musician are primarily rooted in late-'60s, '70s and '80s British music, from the albums Let It Bleed by The Rolling Stones, Abbey Road by The Beatles, Diamond Dogs by David Bowie and Oranges & Lemons by XTC, which was introduced to him by his friend on his car stereo in the late '80s.

At age 12 he bought his first record, Dressed to Kill by Kiss, and was inspired by guitarist Ace Frehley. He took guitar lessons for four years from that point.

Personal life
He has honour degrees in English and philosophy.

Discography

Crash Test Dummies

 The Ghosts That Haunt Me (1991)
 God Shuffled His Feet (1993)
 A Worm's Life (1996)
 Give Yourself a Hand (1999)
 I Don't Care That You Don't Mind (2001)
 Jingle All the Way (2002)
 Puss 'n' Boots (2003)
 Songs of the Unforgiven (2004)
 Oooh La La! (2010)

Solo
 Rajanaka: Mantra (2011)

Collaborations
 Midnight Garden (with Rob Morsberger) (2012)

Live 
 Crash Test Dude (2001)

Videos
 Crash Test Dude (2001)

References

External links

Crash Test Dummies members
1964 births
Living people
Canadian rock guitarists
Canadian male guitarists
University of Winnipeg alumni
Canadian bass-baritones
Musicians from Winnipeg
Writers from Winnipeg